Newks may refer to:

 Newk's Eatery, an American chain of fast casual cafés
 Newark Newks, a Newark, Ohio baseball team